Aref Karim  (born 7 February 1953) is a Bangladeshi-born British accountant, hedge fund manager, and founder, chief executive officer and chief investment officer of Quality Capital Management (QCM).

Early life
Karim's father worked into the civil service and then the British government worked up and became a senior officer in government of Bengal under British rule until 1947.

Karim was born in East Bengal, Pakistan (now Bangladesh). He is the youngest of 10 siblings, he has three brothers and six sisters. He attended a private American missionary school, then went to an American college and read English and economics at university. However, when the Bangladesh Liberation War broke out the university closed down and Karim continued his degree in Karachi, West Pakistan.

In the early 1970s, during the first year of his master's degree, he left East Pakistan (now Bangladesh) when he got caught in the middle of the Bangladesh Liberation War so when the opportunity came he fled.

Career
Karim moved to London and found a job as an articled clerk. In 1978, he qualified as a chartered accountant.

After serving in public practice as senior audit manager for some years in London, Karim joined the Abu Dhabi Investment Authority (ADIA) as a financial manager on a two-year contract. Two years became four years, became six, became 12, and he went into investment management role. During his tenure at ADIA as Senior Investment Manager, he looked after the investment policies, strategies and asset allocation for a multibillion-dollar Alternative Investment Portfolio. He was with the institution from March 1982 until May 1995 before returning to the UK.

In September 1995, Karim moved from the buying (allocation) to selling (fund management), and in December 1995 founded his own hedge fund Quality Capital Management (QCM) based in Weybridge, Surrey. He relocated to Weybridge, partly so his children would be educated there. He is the board member, chief executive officer and chief investment officer, carrying responsibility for the firm's investment strategies and research. In the years since, QCM has returned more than 600 per cent growth to its investors, with only two negative years. It has assets in the region of £150 million according to the Sunday Times Rich List. In 2008, the hedge fund made £42.9m profit on £49.3m sales, returning 59 per cent.

Karim has academic knowledge of physics, chemistry and mathematics as well as a chartered accountancy qualification. He is also a hedge fund investor. He is also Fellow of the Institute of Chartered Accountants in England and Wales (ICAEW).

Awards and nominations
In January 2015, Karim was nominated for Businessman of the Year award at the British Muslim Awards.

Personal life
Karim has three children. His wife died in 1992.

See also
British Bangladeshi
List of British Bangladeshis

References

External links
Quality Capital Management website

1953 births
Living people
Bangladeshi Muslims
British Muslims
Bangladeshi emigrants to England
British people of Bangladeshi descent
Naturalised citizens of the United Kingdom
British accountants
British chief executives
Bangladeshi businesspeople
People from Weybridge
Chief investment officers
20th-century Bengalis
21st-century Bengalis